Dmytro Vitaliyovych Shamych (born 15 May 2001) is a Ukrainian professional footballer who plays as a right winger for Czech club Banik Sokolov.

Club career

Metalist Kharkiv 
He made his professional debut and scored his first professional goal for Metalist Kharkiv in the winning Ukrainian Cup match against Yarud Mariupol on 18 August 2021.

References

External links
 Profile on Metalist Kharkiv official website
 

2001 births
Living people
Ukrainian footballers
Footballers from Kyiv
Association football forwards
FC Kolos Kovalivka players
FC Metalist Kharkiv players
Ukrainian First League players